1919 legislative elections can refer to:
 1919 French legislative election
 1919 Georgian legislative election
 1919 Luxembourgian legislative election
 1919 Philippine legislative election
 1919 Polish legislative election